Marta Justina Lafuente (16 March 1968 – 2 June 2022) was a Paraguayan psychologist and politician.

Biography
Lafuente studied psychology at the Universidad Católica Nuestra Señora de la Asunción, an institution where she also worked as a lecturer and scholar.

On 15 August 2013 she was sworn in as Minister of Education and Culture of Paraguay in the cabinet of President Horacio Cartes. Following wide student mobilizations, she announced her resignation on 5 May 2016.

She died on 2 June 2022, at the age of 54.

References

1968 births
2022 deaths
Universidad Católica Nuestra Señora de la Asunción alumni
Paraguayan psychologists
Paraguayan women psychologists
Education Ministers of Paraguay
Culture ministers of Paraguay
21st-century Paraguayan women politicians
21st-century Paraguayan politicians
Women government ministers of Paraguay